Putterlickia, variously called spikethorns, false spike thorns, mock spike thorns and bastard spike thorns, are a genus of flowering plants in the staff vine and bittersweet family Celastraceae, native to South Africa, Eswatini and Mozambique. Endophytic bacteria in their roots produce maytansine.

Species
Currently accepted species include:

Putterlickia neglecta Jordaan, R.G.C.Boon & A.E.van Wyk
Putterlickia pyracantha (L.) Szyszyl.
Putterlickia retrospinosa A.E.van Wyk & Mostert
Putterlickia saxatilis (Burch.) Jordaan
Putterlickia verrucosa (E.Mey. ex Harv. & Sond.) Sim

References 

Celastraceae